LaGrange Township or La Grange Township may refer to:

 La Grange Township, Lafayette County, Arkansas, in Lafayette County, Arkansas
 Lagrange Township, Bond County, Illinois
 LaGrange Township, Harrison County, Iowa, in Harrison County, Iowa
 LaGrange Township, Michigan
 LaGrange Township, Lorain County, Ohio

See also
 Grange Township (disambiguation)

Township name disambiguation pages